Elvira "Vi" Redd (born September 20, 1928) is an American jazz alto saxophone player, vocalist and educator. She has been active since the early 1950s and is known primarily for playing in the blues style. She is highly regarded as an accomplished veteran who has performed with Count Basie, Rahsaan Roland Kirk, Linda Hopkins, Marian McPartland and Dizzy Gillespie.

Life and career 
Redd was born in Los Angeles, the daughter of New Orleans jazz drummer and Clef Club co-founder Alton Redd and Mattie Redd (née Thomas). Her mother played saxophone, although not professionally, and her brother was a percussionist. She was deeply influenced during her formative years by her father, who was one of the leading figures on the Central Avenue jazz scene. Another important musical mentor was her paternal great aunt Alma Hightower, who convinced the 10-year-old Redd to switch from piano to saxophone. During junior high school, Redd played alto saxophone in a band with Melba Liston and Dexter Gordon.

Redd graduated from Los Angeles State College in 1954, and earned a teaching certificate from University of Southern California. After working for the Board of Education from 1957 to 1960, Redd returned to jazz. She played in Las Vegas in 1962, toured with Earl Hines in 1964 and led a group in San Francisco in the mid-1960s with her husband, drummer Richie Goldberg. During this time, Redd also worked with Max Roach. While active, she toured as far as Japan, London (including an unprecedented 10 weeks at Ronnie Scott's), Sweden, Spain and Paris. In 1969, she settled in Los Angeles where she played locally while also working as an educator. She led albums for United Artists (1962) and Atco (1962–63). Her 1963 album Lady Soul features many prominent jazz figures of the day, including Bill Perkins, Jennell Hawkins, Barney Kessel, Leroy Vinnegar, Leroy Harrison, Dick Hyman, Paul Griffin, Bucky Pizzarelli, Ben Tucker and Dave Bailey. The liner notes are by Leonard Feather.

Redd taught and lectured for many years from the 1970s onward upon returning to Los Angeles. She served on the music advisory panel of the National Endowment for the Arts in the late 1970s. In 1989, she received the Lifetime Achievement Award from the Los Angeles Jazz Society. In 2001, she received the Mary Lou Williams Women in Jazz Award from the Kennedy Center.

Discography
 Bird Call (United Artists, 1962) 
 Lady Soul (Atco, 1963)
 Now's the Time with Marian McPartland, Mary Osborne (Halcyon, 1977)

References

Further reading 
Interviews
 Rowe, Monk. Vi Redd. Hamilton College Jazz Archive, February 13, 1999.

Publications

External links
 
 
 

African-American saxophonists
American educators
American jazz alto saxophonists
Bebop saxophonists
Count Basie Orchestra members
Hard bop saxophonists
Jazz alto saxophonists
Living people
Post-bop saxophonists
Soul-jazz saxophonists
Soul-jazz vocalists
American women jazz singers
American jazz singers
California State University, Los Angeles alumni
1928 births
21st-century American saxophonists
Women jazz saxophonists
21st-century American women musicians
African-American women musicians